Colin Wilson (born 19 May 1993) is a Scottish footballer, who played as a defender for Raith Rovers and Montrose.

Career
Wilson progressed through the youth sides before earning a full-time contract with Raith Rovers in June 2010. He featured in pre-season friendly matches in advance of the 2011–12 season, such as the 0–0 draw against English side Southend United.

Wilson made his senior debut on 12 November 2011 as a substitute for Dougie Hill in a 1–0 defeat against Ayr United in a Scottish First Division fixture.

In March 2012 he joined junior side Musselburgh Athletic on loan until the end of the season.

Career statistics
.

a.  Includes other competitive competitions, including the Scottish Challenge Cup & East of Scotland Cup.

References

External links

1993 births
Living people
Scottish footballers
Association football defenders
Scottish Football League players
Scottish Junior Football Association players
Raith Rovers F.C. players
Musselburgh Athletic F.C. players
Montrose F.C. players